Erik Voeten (born 1972) is a Dutch political scientist.

Voeten studied public administration and public policy at the University of Twente and earned a doctorate at Princeton University. He completed postdoctoral research at Stanford University's Center for International Security and Cooperation, then joined the George Washington University faculty as an assistant professor. Voeten was named Peter F. Krogh Professor of Global Justice and Geopolitics at the Edmund A. Walsh School of Foreign Service within Georgetown University in 2007. He succeeded Jon Pevehouse as chief editor of the International Organization in July 2017.

References

1972 births
Living people
Dutch political scientists
Dutch expatriates in the United States
Princeton University alumni
University of Twente alumni
Walsh School of Foreign Service faculty
George Washington University faculty
Political science journal editors